Mandy Lutwama Juruni (born 12 May 1967) is a Ugandan professional basketball coach and former player. He is the head coach of the City Oilers since 2012, and is widely regarded the most decorated basketball coach in Ugandan basketball history.
Juruni has also been the head coach of Uganda’s national basketball team (nicknamed the Silverbacks), which he led to two straight qualifications to the AfroBasket, the official African Basketball Championship.

Playing career 
During his playing career, Juruni played as point guard and played for the Charging Rhinos from 2003 to 2007.

Coaching career 
Juruni began coaching the City Oilers, who played in the national second division. He started as a player-coach at the time, before later taking on coaching duties. In 2012, he was also hired by the Kyambogo Warriors, whom he guided to the top-flight UNBL championship.

Juruni guided the Oilers to eight UNBL championships and one BAL qualification.

Honors
2013–2019, 2022: Champion of the National Basketball League (Uganda)

References

External links
eurobasket.com Profile

1967 births
Living people
Basketball coaches
Ugandan basketball coaches
Sportspeople from Kampala
City Oilers players